Bride of Chucky is a 1998 American black comedy horror film written by Don Mancini and directed by Ronny Yu. The fourth installment in the Child's Play franchise, it stars Jennifer Tilly, Brad Dourif, John Ritter, Katherine Heigl, and Nick Stabile. Unlike the first three films, Bride of Chucky takes a markedly humorous turn towards self-referential parody. It also departs from the Andy Barclay storyline of the first three films, focusing mainly on series villain Chucky, a doll possessed by a serial killer, and his former lover and accomplice Tiffany, whose soul is also transferred into a doll.

Bride of Chucky was released on October 16, 1998. The film grossed over $50 million worldwide on a budget of $25 million, and received mixed reviews from critics. A sequel, Seed of Chucky, was released in 2004.

Plot
Set in 1998, Tiffany, a former lover and accomplice of serial killer Charles Lee Ray, bribes a police officer into giving her the dismembered parts of a children's doll—which Ray's soul inhabited—from an evidence locker before murdering him. Believing that Ray's soul still inhabits the doll, Tiffany stitches and staples Chucky back together and reenacts the voodoo ritual which had instilled Ray's soul inside the doll ten years prior.

Though her incantations appear to fail, Chucky comes alive and smothers Tiffany's goth admirer Damien to death with a pillow as Tiffany watches in excitement. Tiffany presents Chucky with a ring he had left behind the night he was killed, which she believed to be an engagement ring. When Chucky explains he never intended on marrying Tiffany, she locks him in a playpen and taunts him with a bride doll. Chucky escapes the playpen and murders Tiffany by electrocuting her in a bathtub.

He then transports her soul into the bride doll, and says they must retrieve a magical amulet that was buried with his human body in order to transfer their souls into the bodies of Tiffany's neighbor Jesse and his girlfriend Jade. Tiffany calls Jesse and asks him to take the two dolls to Hackensack, New Jersey, where Ray's body is buried, in exchange for money. Eager to elope with Jade, Jesse accepts the offer. Jade's strict uncle, police chief Warren Kincaid, plants a bag of marijuana in Jesse's van to frame him. Chucky and Tiffany rig a trap which embeds several nails into Warren's face, then hide his body within the van. Jesse and Jade begin their trip. The two are pulled over by Officer Norton, who finds the marijuana in Jesse's van. After Norton returns to his patrol car to report it, Chucky stuffs a shirt into the car's gas tank and lights it on fire. The car explodes with Norton inside, and Jesse and Jade flee the scene.

They both begin to suspect that one of them might have caused the incident and begin to distrust each other. Despite their issues, Jesse and Jade get married. While at a hotel, another couple steals Jesse's money. As the couple have sex in their room, Tiffany murders them by causing them to be impaled by glass shards. Seeing this, Chucky proposes to Tiffany and the two have sex. The following morning, Jesse and Jade flee with their friend David, who came to the hotel after they both called him separately the previous night, worried the other might be the killer. David informs Jesse and Jade that they are the prime suspects for the deaths, but says he believes them to both be innocent. Upon finding Warren's dead body, David holds them at gunpoint and alerts a police officer. The dolls come alive, causing David to back onto the highway, where he is run over. Jesse and Jade drive away with the dolls, who reveal their plan.

They steal an RV to evade the police, where Jesse and Jade instigate a fight between Chucky and Tiffany; in the commotion, Jade locks Tiffany into an oven, Jesse pushes Chucky out the window, and the RV crashes into a ditch. Chucky forces Jade to take him to his gravesite while Jesse follows with Tiffany. Obeying Chucky's orders, Jade retrieves the amulet from the casket. Jesse then appears with Tiffany and they trade hostages, but Chucky throws a knife into Jesse's back and ties up the couple for the ritual. As Chucky begins the incantation, Tiffany kisses him and stabs him with his knife. A battle ensues, and Tiffany collapses after being stabbed in the heart by Chucky. Jesse knocks Chucky into his own grave with a shovel. Private investigator Lt. Preston arrives and sees Chucky, walking and talking in the grave. Jade grabs Preston's gun and shoots Chucky several times in the chest, killing him.

After contacting the police and declaring the teens innocent, Preston sends the couple on their way home. As he inspects Tiffany's body, she springs awake and starts screaming, giving birth to a baby doll which attacks Preston.

Cast

 Jennifer Tilly as Tiffany
 Brad Dourif as Chucky (voice)
 Katherine Heigl as Jade
 Nick Stabile as Jesse
 Alexis Arquette as Damien
 Gordon Michael Woolvett as David
 John Ritter as Chief Warren Kincaid
 Lawrence Dane as Lt. Preston
 Michael Louis Johnson as Norton
 James Gallanders as Russ
 Janet Kidder as Diane
 Vince Corazza as Bailey
 Kathy Najimy as Motel Maid
 Park Bench as Stoner
 Emily Weedon as Girl at One-Stop
 Ben Bass as Lt. Ellis
 Roger McKeen as Justice of the Peace
 Sandi Stahlbrand as Reporter

Production

Pre-production 
After the release of Child's Play 3, Don Mancini and David Kirschner decided that the series required a new direction, and decided against returning the character of Andy Barclay. Work on the film began in 1996, with the working title Child's Play 4: Bride of Chucky, inspired by the release of Scream. Mancini said, "Like most genres, the horror genre goes in cycles and I think we can thank Kevin Williamson and Scream for reinvigorating the market. Over the years, I had been imagining new scenarios for this series. With his previous successes, we knew it was just a matter of time before we'd be bringing Chucky back and David Kirschner and I both felt that it was important to bring him back in a new way -- we wanted to elevate the series and re-invent it, go beyond what we'd done before. And what we've ended up with is—incredibly—part horror, part comedy, part romance and part road movie. It's a really cool blend of the genuinely creepy and the really funny." Ronny Yu was hired to direct the film after Kirschner and Mancini were "amazed" by his film The Bride with White Hair, and was allowed to use his creative freedom and the ability to hire his collaborators Peter Pau and David Wu from Hong Kong. The inspiration to create a girlfriend for Chucky came from David Kirschner after he saw a copy of the classic Bride of Frankenstein in a video store. Mancini loved the idea and created Tiffany. He said, "After all, two dolls running around the country together and killing people a la Natural Born Killer Dolls or Barbie and Clyde is really pretty funny." Mancini chose Tilly as his first choice to play Tiffany, after being impressed with her in Bound and Bullets Over Broadway. Gina Gershon, Tilly's co-star in Bound, encouraged her to take the role. In retrospect, Mancini commented: "Once we introduced Jennifer Tilly's character [...] that brought a certain comedic camp vibe [to the franchise], which I think is kind of historically a hallmark of gay culture," referring to the increasing use of LGBTQ+ characters in later Chucky films and TV series. Several months before production actually began on the film, Kevin Yagher and his team began to create animatronic puppets for Chucky and Tiffany. For Chucky alone, nine different puppets were used.

Filming
Jennifer Tilly provided Tiffany's voice-over dialogue during a three-day recording session held in tandem with Brad Dourif just prior to the start of principal photography. Bride of Chucky was filmed over a twelve week period in and around Toronto, Canada. Over half of the film was shot on the sound stage. Exterior locations that were utilized included the Clifton Hill strip in Niagara Falls, an art deco motel complex on Toronto's waterfront, an old army camp in Oshawa, and numerous rural areas.

Each doll required seven puppeteers to manipulate, a computer playback operator, and a puppet coordinator to act as liaison between the operators and the director. Three puppeteers handled the movement of each doll's facial features which were relayed through the use of a radio-controlled transmitter. All of the dolls' other below-the-head movements were cable-operated by the rest of the puppeteers. The dolls' skin featured a combination of silicone and foam latex, unlike the previous Child's Play films, where the dolls were only made of foam latex, a material that had to be painted in a way that made it very difficult to light.

Brock Winkless, who is among the 17 puppeteers who worked on this film, returned as the puppeteer of Chucky for the last time. Ed Gale and Debbie Lee Carrington performed in-suit as Chucky and Tiffany (credited as Chucky Double and Tiffany Double) respectively during the graveyard scene.

Soundtrack
 Blondie – "Call Me"
 Rob Zombie – "Living Dead Girl"
 The Screamin' Cheetah Wheelies – "Boogie King"
 White Zombie – "Thunder Kiss '65"
 Coal Chamber – "Blisters"
 Monster Magnet – "See You in Hell"
 Judas Priest – "Blood Stained"
 Type O Negative – "Love You to Death"
 Slayer – "Human Disease"
 Stabbing Westward – "So Wrong"
 Powerman 5000 – "The Son of X-51"
 Bruce Dickinson – "Trumpets of Jericho"
 Static-X – "Bled for Days"
 Motörhead – "Love for Sale"
 Kidneythieves – "Crazy" (Willie Nelson cover)
 Graeme Revell – "We Belong Dead"

Release 
Bride of Chucky was released in North America on October 16, 1998, and grossed $11.8 million on its opening weekend.  It has a total North American gross of $32.4 million and another $18.3 million internationally. It is the highest grossing film of the Chucky franchise and the second most financially successful Chucky film in the US.

To promote the film, Chucky made an appearance on the October 12, 1998 episode of WCW Monday Nitro as a heel. He interrupted a promo between Gene Okerlund and Rick Steiner and, in addition to asking viewers to watch the film, mentioned that he was hoping for Scott Steiner to win an upcoming match between the brothers.

Reception 
On the review aggregator website Rotten Tomatoes, the film has an approval rating of 50% based on 38 reviews, with an average rating of 5.7/10. The site's critics consensus reads, "Bride of Chucky is devoid of any fright and the franchise has become tiresomely self-parodic, although horror fans may find some pleasure in this fourth entry's camp factor." Audiences polled by CinemaScore gave the film an average grade of "B" on an A+ to F scale.

Lawrence Van Gelder, writing for The New York Times, gave the film a mostly negative review, writing that "the novelty of a bloody horror film built around a malevolent doll carrying the soul of a serial killer has worn thin." Lisa Schwarzbaum of Entertainment Weekly gave the film a grade of "D", calling it an "upchucking of cartoonish gore" that "leans heavily on self-referential gags". Xan Brooks of The Independent gave the film a score of two out of five, writing: "Bride of Chucky strings together a series of humorous asides and knee-jerk shock tactics."

The Los Angeles Times John Anderson wrote that "Ronny Yu milks the utter inanity of Chucky's existence for all it's worth and knows the conventions of the genre well enough that horror fans should feel total gratification--in the levels of both mayhem and grotesque humor." Mick LaSalle of the San Francisco Chronicle wrote that "No one will confuse Bride of Chucky with a classic like Bride of Frankenstein, but anyone looking for nasty laughs will be delighted." Marc Savlov of The Austin Chronicle gave the film a score of three-and-a-half out of five stars; he commended its visuals and "witty, pithy script", and wrote: "this fourth entry in the killer doll franchise is by far and away the best, a surprisingly affecting tale of pint-sized love and dismemberment that's remarkably well-done."

Brad Dourif has said Bride of Chucky is his personal favorite film in the series.

Awards

Sequels
The film was followed by multiple sequels, including Seed of Chucky in 2004 and the TV series Chucky in 2021.

References

External links
 
 
 
 

1998 films
1998 horror films
1990s comedy horror films
American black comedy films
American sequel films
American road movies
American parody films
1990s English-language films
Child's Play (franchise) films
Films about runaways
Films set in 1998
Films set in New Jersey
Films shot in Toronto
Films shot in Los Angeles
Films set in hotels
Universal Pictures films
Films directed by Ronny Yu
Films scored by Graeme Revell
Films set in New York (state)
1998 comedy films
1990s American films
Films about Voodoo